This is a population history of the 64 counties of the US State of Colorado since the 2000 United States census as estimated by the United States Census Bureau. 

El Paso County with a 2021 population estimate of 737,867 remains the most populous county, while San Juan County with a 2021 population of 733 remains the least populous. Five of the 64 Colorado counties now have more than 500,000 residents, while 12 have fewer than 5,000 residents.

The following table will be expanded as additional censuses are taken.


Colorado counties

See also

Colorado
Bibliography of Colorado
Index of Colorado-related articles
Outline of Colorado
Colorado statistical areas
Geography of Colorado
History of Colorado
List of places in Colorado
List of counties in Colorado
List of Colorado county high points
List of highest counties in the United States
List of highest U.S. county high points
List of mountain passes in Colorado
List of mountain peaks of Colorado
List of mountain ranges of Colorado
List of populated places in Colorado
List of census-designated places in Colorado
List of county seats in Colorado
List of forts in Colorado
List of ghost towns in Colorado
List of historic places in Colorado
List of municipalities in Colorado
List of populated places in Colorado by county
List of post offices in Colorado
List of rivers of Colorado
List of protected areas of Colorado
List of statistical areas in Colorado

Notes

References

External links

United States Department of Commerce
United States Census Bureau
State of Colorado
Department of Local Affairs
Colorado County Clerks Association
History Colorado

Population history of Colorado counties
Colorado history-related lists
Lists of populated places in Colorado
Local government in Colorado
Colorado counties, Population history of